Zunser is a surname. Notable people with the surname include:

Eliakum Zunser (1836–1913), Lithuanian Jewish Yiddish-language poet and songwriter
Miriam Shomer Zunser (1882–1951), American journalist, playwright, and artist

See also
Zinser